Microangelo Toolset is a collection of software utilities (Studio, Explorer, Librarian, Animator, On Display) for editing Microsoft Windows computer icons and pointers.

Microangelo Toolset is one of the best known icon editing and creation software tools.

Notable for winning the Shareware Industry Awards 6 times in 7 years.

See also
List of icon software

References

External links
 

Icon software
Raster graphics editors
Windows graphics-related software